The Sawyers Crossing Covered Bridge , also known as the Cresson Bridge, is a wooden covered bridge carrying Sawyers Crossing Road over the Ashuelot River in west Swanzey, New Hampshire.  Built in 1859 to replace an older bridge, it continues to serve as a part of Swanzey's transportation network, and is one of the state's few surviving 19th-century covered bridges.  It was listed on the National Register of Historic Places in 1978.

Description and history
The Sawyers Crossing Covered Bridge is located west of Swanzey's village center, spanning the Ashuelot River in a roughly east–west orientation. It is a two-span Town truss construction, resting on abutments and a central pier made of split granite. Its exterior is finished in vertical board siding, and it is covered by a metal gabled roof. The portals are rectangular with rounded corners at the top.

The bridge was built in 1859 to replace a bridge built in 1771.  It has had metal parts (tie rods and bolts) added to increase its strength, and it continues to receive regular maintenance.  It gained some notice in 1953, when a picture of it was used in a cigarette advertising campaign, in which it was known as the "kissing bridge".

See also

List of New Hampshire covered bridges
List of bridges on the National Register of Historic Places in New Hampshire
National Register of Historic Places listings in Cheshire County, New Hampshire

References

External links
Sawyer's Crossing, NH Division of Historical Resources

Covered bridges on the National Register of Historic Places in New Hampshire
Bridges completed in 1859
Wooden bridges in New Hampshire
Tourist attractions in Cheshire County, New Hampshire
Bridges in Cheshire County, New Hampshire
National Register of Historic Places in Cheshire County, New Hampshire
Swanzey, New Hampshire
Road bridges on the National Register of Historic Places in New Hampshire
Lattice truss bridges in the United States